Mahane Yatir (lit. Yatir Camp), also known as Lev Yatir (Heart of Yatir), is a village in the Yatir Forest in southern Israel.

History
The village was established in 1979, and was named after a biblical city (Joshua 15:48) here in the allotment of the Tribe of Judah In 2008 a gar'in was formed to establish a new village, Hiran, in the nearby area. The group moved to Mahane Yatir in 2010 in order to acclimatise to local conditions. In 2013 it was added to the Israel Central Bureau of Statistics count of localities.

References

Villages in Israel
Populated places in Southern District (Israel)
Populated places established in 1979
1979 establishments in Israel